Klaus Röder (often spelled Roeder; born 7 April 1948) is a German musician and music teacher. Born in Stuttgart, Germany, he currently lives and teaches in Langenfeld, Rhineland, Germany. Röder is married and has three children.

He studied violin and piano, then began a study of sound engineering in 1968, later switching to part-time studies in composition and guitar at the Robert Schumann Hochschule in Düsseldorf, ultimately graduating in 1980 with a diploma in electronic music composition.

Interested in experimental and avant garde music he began creating custom-made instruments, also using synthesizers and tape recorders to manipulate recorded sounds.

During this period he played guitar (used as a sound trigger device for synthesizer) in a free jazz group, Synthesis, and briefly, during 1974, with the electronic band Kraftwerk.

Since 1975 he has worked from his own electronic music studio, latterly using personal computers entirely for composing and creating music.

Röder had an interview about his Kraftwerk time on music documentary film "Kraftwerk And The Electronic Revolution" produced by Rob Johnstone, released in 2008.

Discography
With Kraftwerk
1974: Autobahn

As Solo
 1978 Schmutzmusik
 1981 Elektronische Kompositionen / Klaus Röder
 1985 Kompositionen 1981 - 1983
 1993 Kristallisationen 5
 1999 Live-Music 1
 2002 Frozen Sounds
 2009 Kristallisationen - LP
 2010 Kristallisationen 2 - LP

Documentary
 2008 Kraftwerk And The Electronic Revolution

References

External links
 
 

1948 births
Musicians from Stuttgart
Living people
German rock guitarists
German male guitarists
Kraftwerk members
German electronic musicians
German experimental musicians